12 Stories is the debut studio album by American country music singer-songwriter Brandy Clark, released on October 22, 2013, through Slate Creek Records. Clark wrote or co-wrote all 12 of the songs 
and it features Vince Gill on background vocals. The songs on the album are mostly ones which were admired by, but not recorded by, other artists, possibly due to the provocative storytelling and their content, which is a Clark trademark. Two of the album's tracks were previously recorded by other artists: "Crazy Women" was a Top 40 hit on the Billboard Hot Country Songs chart for LeAnn Rimes as the second single from her 2011 album, Lady & Gentlemen, and "The Day She Got Divorced" was previously recorded by Reba McEntire for her 2010 album, All the Women I Am.

Background
When Clark first moved to Nashville around 1997 she wanted to be a recording artist, but instead concentrated on her song writing which is her true passion. It took her many years to hone a voice as an individual artist with a view to creating songs which would be commercially viable and which people wanted to listen to. She played occasional gigs and made demo tapes enough to finance an EP to sell at songwriters’ night shows. In 2010 her two co-managers heard that EP and told her they would help finance a full studio record along with a management company. As a respected Music Row songwriter she was also encouraged by friends in the business to release a batch of her own material. 12 Stories was finished nearly two years before its release, as Clark waited for record label interest and distribution. 
Previous to this and during that time span she had become a part of a tight circle of friends and regular song collaborators that included singing songwriters Miranda Lambert, Ashley Monroe, Kacey Musgraves, Shane McAnally, Josh Osborne and Trevor Rosen, some of whom contribute to the album.

Music and lyrics
Teaming up with producer Dave Brainard, 12 Stories draws on styles such as country folk and catchy country pop performed in midtempo in both classic and contemporary styles with arrangements which are sparse and clean. They first toyed with making the album a concept record, chronicling a couple's relationship but ended up rejecting the idea but that instinct is evident in the track listing order. The album is full of diverse characters in which Clark tells stories which manage to be dramatic, humorous, heartfelt and down right honest in which she examines and celebrates her characters. Describing her songs, Randy Lewis from the Los Angeles Times wrote: "find this record and listen to a dozen dazzlingly witty and insightful takes on the struggles of the working class ("Pray to Jesus"), neglected and/or mistreated women ("Crazy Women," "The Day She Got Divorced"), the battle between right and wrong ("What'll Keep Me Out of Heaven") and the pros and cons of chemical mood enhancers" ("Hungover," "Get High").

"I think my music is a dark comedy, just as I think life is a dark comedy," said Brandy. "The truth is funny sometimes. I don't ever want to come across as corny or novelty, but you have to laugh at things. I feel like this record is about what's really going on in life." "I get my inspiration from real people who are just surviving their lives and getting through their days. That's who I write songs for," she explained.

The song "Stripes" was co-written with Shane McAnally at a songwriters retreat at Center Hill Lake. It was released in America as a single which premiered on Sirius XM Holdings. The official video made its CMT debut on July 4, 2013. 
The release of the album coincides with a breakthrough year for Clark after being named as one of CMT's Next Women of Country and gaining well-deserved attention after scoring a CMA Song of the Year nomination for her contribution to "Mama’s Broken Heart" and enjoying chart-topping success as a writer of The Band Perry's No.1 song "Better Dig Two."

Critical reception

12 Stories received highly positive reviews from music critics. At Metacritic, which assigns a normalized rating out of 100 to reviews from mainstream critics, the album has an average score of 89 out of 100, which indicates "universal acclaim" based on 6 reviews.

Regarding Clark's writing, Stephen Thomas Erlewine of AllMusic commented, "She's on the outside but she's an observer, not an outcast, noticing the quirks and eccentricities of her brethren instead of diving head-on into their madness" and describing her singing said, "she avoids full-throated showstoppers for something better: she's sly and strong, mining heartbreak and sneaking in punch lines at unexpected times" and that the "strength and clarity" of Clark's voice becomes undeniable. He concludes "the superb 12 Stories showcases a unique artist who stands firmly, proudly on her own merits" 

At American Songwriter, Jonathan Bernstein noted the simplicity of the album title "gives a good sense of Clark's direct, plain-spoken, songwriting" and that her debut was "a welcome, engrossing respite from the party-fueled escapism that's dominated Music City throughout the summer of 2013"
Jon Freeman of Country Weekly described the set as "a staggeringly great collection of original tunes that paint vivid, honest portraits of real life, from a uniquely feminine perspective"

Grady Smith of Entertainment Weekly noted that Clark "keeps things edgy, singing about divorce, drugs, jail, and Jesus—a.k.a. country music’s Golden Quadrangle, with matter-of-fact sass and ample twang"

Will Hermes, writing for Rolling Stone, concludes that Brandy's ear "is unerring and her characters true" describing her as " the kind of talent who makes the term "alt-country" unnecessary"

At Roughstock, Matt Bjorke said Clark possesses a voice "that recalls Mary Chapin Carpenter, Suzy Bogguss, Kathy Mattea and Trisha Yearwood" and described her as "a unique talent in that she writes songs that are classic and contemporary all at the same time" and that 12 Stories is "one of the strongest albums of 2013 and of any album released in this new century". 

Billboard writer Chuck Dauphin began his review with one word, "Wow", and clarified, "I don’t think I have ever started a review so simply in my decade-plus of writing them. But, sometimes, you can say a lot more with less than you can otherwise". He said that Clark has assembled an album that potentially will "stand beside such landmark female collections" as Lee Ann Womack's 2005 released There's More Where That Came From and Reba McEntire's 1996 album Whoever's in New England. He described the single, "Stripes", as having "a modern day Loretta Lynn twist" and that perhaps the coolest line of any song during 2013 is "There’s no crime of passion worth a crime of fashion"
 
Jody Rosen from New York Magazine declared "12 Stories Is My Favorite Album of 2013."

In the January 2014 issue of leading UK country music publication Country Music People, editor Duncan Warwick made it his "5 Star CD of the Month", summing up with "Every song tells a story and Brandy Clark makes them all riveting. Now I have to remove an album from my best of the year to make room for this."

Commercial performance
12 Stories debuted at No. 197 on the Billboard 200 and at No. 28 on the Billboard Top Country Albums chart with 2,000 copies sold in its first week of release. It re-entered the Billboard 200 at a new peak of 163 for the chart dated December 7, 2013, and also peaked at the Top Country Album chart at No. 23.  The album has sold 46,000 copies in the U.S. as of February 2015.

Track listing

Personnel
Credits adapted from the liner notes of 12 Stories.

Musicians
 Brandy Clark – acoustic guitar, lead vocals
 Dave Brainard – acoustic guitar, percussion, mandolin, bass guitar, keyboards
 Marco Giovino – drums
 Harry Stinson – drums
 Gregg Lohman – drums (track 10)
 Byron House – bass guitar, upright bass
 Tim Marks – bass guitar (tracks 2,7,12)
 Chris Donahue – upright bass (tracks 4,10)
 Will Doughty – piano, keyboards
 Rob McNelly – electric guitar
 Tim Teague – B-Bender Guitar (track 3)
 Chris Leuzinger – electric guitar (track 7)
 Smith Curry – lap steel guitar
 Bruce Bouton – steel guitar (track 7)
 Dan Dugmore – Dobro (tracks 2,4)
 Sweepy Walker – harmonica, percussion
 John Deaderick – accordion (track 1)

 Megan Mullins – violin (track 1)
 Jason Fitz – violin (tracks 8,11,12)
 Carol Rabinowitz – cello
 Jimmy Nichols – keyboard, strings (tracks 5,7)
 Vince Gill – vocals
 Kacey Musgraves – vocals
 Shane McAnally – background vocals
 Ray Scott – background vocals
 Bonnie Baker – background vocals
 Tiffany Goss – background vocals
 Josh Osborne – background vocals

Technical
 Dave Brainard – record producer, overdubs, editing, mixing
 Brian Kolb – mixing
 Eric Conn – mastering
 Don Cobb – mastering

Tracked by Brian Kolb at Ben Fold's Studio Nashville TN (assisted by Leslie Richter)

Charts

References

2013 debut albums
Brandy Clark albums
Slate Creek Records albums
Albums produced by Dave Brainard